In statistics, non-sampling error is a catch-all term for the deviations of estimates from their true values that are not a function of the sample chosen, including various systematic errors and random errors that are not due to sampling. Non-sampling errors are much harder to quantify than sampling errors.

Non-sampling errors in survey estimates can arise from:

 Coverage errors, such as failure to accurately represent all population units in the sample, or the inability to obtain information about all sample cases;
 Response errors by respondents due for example to definitional differences, misunderstandings, or deliberate misreporting;
 Mistakes in recording the data or coding it to standard classifications;
 Pseudo-opinions given by respondents when they have no opinion, but do not wish to say so
 Other errors of collection, nonresponse, processing, or imputation of values for missing or inconsistent data.

An excellent discussion of issues pertaining to non-sampling error can be found in several sources such as Kalton (1983) and Salant and Dillman (1995),

See also 

 Errors and residuals in statistics
 Sampling error

References 

Survey methodology
Errors and residuals
Auditing terms